The 2005 United Indoor Football season was the very first season of the UIF and was succeeded by 2006.  The league champions were the Sioux Falls Storm, who defeated the Sioux City Bandits in United Bowl I.

In the league's first year, the teams were almost exclusively former NIFL or AF2 teams. Black Hills, Evansville, Fort Wayne, Lexington, Ohio Valley, Omaha, Sioux City, Sioux Falls, and Tupelo were all former NIFL members, while Tennessee Valley and Peoria were former AF2 teams. The only team not formerly affiliated with another league was the Dayton Warbirds, who were dropped from the schedule before the season began. None of the former NIFL teams changed their identity, but the former AF2 teams faced legal problems with the names, which belonged to the AF2, and were forced to change.

Standings

 Green indicates clinched playoff berth
 Purple indicates division champion
 Grey indicates best league record

Playoffs

All-Star Teams

External links
 2005 UIF Season Stats

United Indoor Football seasons
2005 in American football